Further processing cost is the cost incurred to make joint products ready for further use or sale after the production process' split-off point.

Example 

Timber sawing produces different joint products as outputs, e.g. grade A and B lumber and scrap wood. Scrap wood can be further processed into wood chips and wood pulp but doing so will let the company incur further costs, i.e. further processing costs.

References 

Costs